Eugène Wintzweiller (13 December 1844 – 6 November 1870) was a French composer, winner of the second Grand Prix de Rome in 1868.

Life
Born in Wœrth (Alsace), Wintzweiller was the son of Louis Wintzweiller, a teacher in his native town, and Madeleine Hirsch. He first studied with Joseph Wackenthaler, then organist (1833–1869) at Strasbourg Cathedral, who sent him to the École Niedermeyer in Paris, a school of classical and religious music, which then trained church organists, choir conductors and kapellmeisters. A scholar of the Roman Catholic Archdiocese of Strasbourg, he studied there at the same time as Gabriel Fauré. He obtained his first piano runner-up in 1861, a second prize for piano and an honorable mention for the organ in 1862.

Wintzweiler studied at the Conservatoire de Paris in Ambroise Thomas' and François Benoist's class. He obtained a first prize in counterpoint, a runner-up in fugue, a second organ runner-up in 1867, and a first organ runner-up in 1868.

He obtained a Second First Grand Prix de Rome in musical composition on 4 August 1868, shared with Alfred Pelletier-Rabuteau. He began his stay at the Villa Medici in Rome in January 1869 and ended it in June 1870.

Wintzweiler died in Arcachon.

Selected works
 Nina on IMSLP
 Chanson du fou on IMSLP
 Joli papillon on IMSLP

References

External links
Prix de Rome 1860-1869 on www.musimem.com

1844 births
1870 deaths
19th-century classical composers
19th-century French composers
19th-century French male musicians
Conservatoire de Paris alumni
French classical organists
French male classical composers
French male organists
French Romantic composers
Prix de Rome for composition
People from Bas-Rhin
Male classical organists
19th-century organists